General elections were held in the Solomon Islands on 22 February 1989. A total of 257 candidates contested the election, the result of which was a landslide victory for the People's Alliance Party, which won 23 of the 38 seats.

Results

References

Solomons
1989 in the Solomon Islands
Elections in the Solomon Islands
Election and referendum articles with incomplete results